The Euryphyminae are a subfamily of grasshoppers in the family Acrididae, based on the type genus Euryphymus and may be called "agile grasshoppers"; it was erected by Vitaly Michailovitsh Dirsh in 1956.  Species have been recorded from parts of sub-Saharan Africa including Madagascar (but the distribution may be incomplete).

Genera
A key to genera is given by Hemp & Rowell.  The Orthoptera Species File includes:
 Acoryphella Giglio-Tos, 1907
 Acrophymus Uvarov, 1922
 Amblyphymus Uvarov, 1922
 Anabibia Dirsh, 1956
 Aneuryphymus Uvarov, 1922
 Brachyphymus Uvarov, 1922
 Calliptamicus Uvarov, 1922
 Calliptamuloides Dirsh, 1956
 Calliptamulus Uvarov, 1922
 Catantopoides Johnsen, 1990
 Euryphymus Stål, 1873
 Kevanacris Dirsh, 1961
 Pachyphymus Uvarov, 1922
 Phymeurus Giglio-Tos, 1907
 Platacanthoides Kirby, 1910
 Plegmapteroides Dirsh, 1959
 Plegmapteropsis Dirsh, 1956
 Plegmapterus Martínez y Fernández-Castillo, 1898
 Rhachitopis Uvarov, 1922
 Rhachitopoides Naskrecki, 1995
 Rhodesiana (grasshopper) Dirsh, 1959
 Somaliacris Dirsh, 1959
 Surudia Uvarov, 1930

References

External links 
 

Orthoptera subfamilies
Acrididae
Orthoptera of Africa